Franz Bonaventura Adalbert Maria Herzog von Bayern (born 14 July 1933), commonly known by the courtesy title Duke of Bavaria, is the head of the House of Wittelsbach, the former ruling family of the Kingdom of Bavaria. His great-grandfather King Ludwig III was the last ruling monarch of Bavaria, being deposed in 1918.

Franz was born in Munich. During the Second World War, the Wittelsbachs were anti-Nazi. The family initially left Nazi Germany for Hungary but were eventually arrested when Germany invaded the country in 1944. Franz was 11 at the time. He spent time in several Nazi concentration camps, including Sachsenhausen concentration camp, then Flossenbürg concentration camp and finally Dachau.

After the war, Franz was a student at the University of Munich and became a collector of modern art. Franz succeeded as head of the House of Wittelsbach, and as pretender to the Bavarian throne, on the death of his father in 1996. He lives at Nymphenburg Palace in Munich and Berg Palace.

Birth
Franz was born on 14 July 1933 in Munich, the son of Albrecht, Duke of Bavaria, and his morganatic wife, Countess Maria Draskovich of Trakostjan of the House of Drašković, a Croatian noble family. On 18 May 1949, when Franz was 15, his grandfather Crown Prince Rupprecht recognised the marriage of Franz's parents as dynastic, and Franz became a prince of Bavaria.

The Wittelsbach dynasty were opposed to the Nazi regime in Germany, and in 1939, Franz's father took his family to Hungary. They lived in Budapest for four years before moving to their Castle at Sárvár in late 1943. In March 1944, Nazi Germany occupied Hungary, and on 6 October 1944 the entire family, including the 11-year-old Franz, were arrested. They were sent to a series of Nazi concentration camps, including Oranienburg and Dachau. At the end of April 1945, they were liberated by the United States Third Army.

Education

After the war, Franz received his secondary education at the Benedictine Abbey of Ettal. He then studied business management at the University of Munich and in Zurich. Franz developed a passion for collecting modern art. Items from his private collection are on permanent loan to the Pinakothek der Moderne in Munich. He is also an honorary trustee of the Museum of Modern Art in New York.

Current activities
His 80th birthday party, in 2013, was held at the Schleissheim Palace near Munich. The party was attended by 2,500 guests, including the then-incumbent Minister-President of Bavaria, Horst Seehofer.

In 2016, he became the donor of the project of restoration of the Statue of St. John of Nepomuk in Divina, Slovakia, realised under auspices of the Embassy of the Federal Republic of Germany in Slovakia. The project was honoured by patronage of Norodom Sihamoni, the king of Cambodia and Simeon II, the last tsar of Bulgaria. The project was completed in the year 2017.

Personal life 
Duke Franz has a longtime partner, Thomas Greinwald, although they have never married. In August 2011, the duke appeared at Prince George Frederick of Prussia's wedding, accompanied by Greinwald and his first cousin once removed (and future heir) Prince Ludwig. They also sat for a photo portrait for Erwin Olaf that was widely published in spring 2021.

Succession rights 
Franz has never married. The heir presumptive to the headship of the House of Wittelsbach is his brother Prince Max, Duke in Bavaria. Because Max has five daughters but no sons, he is followed in the line of succession by his and Franz's first cousin (second cousin in the male line) Prince Luitpold and, in the next generation, by the latter's son Prince Ludwig of Bavaria (born 1982).

Link to the Stuarts

Franz is a direct descendant of the House of Stuart. Were it not for the Act of Settlement 1701, Franz would be the successor to the British and Irish crowns of the Stuart kings. His spokesman has, however, made it clear that this is a purely "hypothetical issue", not a claim that he pursues. Franz personally offered his condolences to the British royal family on the death of Queen Elizabeth II.

Titles, styles and honours

Titles and styles

Franz is traditionally styled as His Royal Highness the Duke of Bavaria, of Franconia and in Swabia, Count Palatine of the Rhine.

Franz was styled Prinz von Bayern at birth. In 1996, after the death of his father, he changed his style to Herzog von Bayern ('Duke of Bavaria').

Honours
 : Commander's cross (Großes Verdienstkreuz) of the Order of Merit of the Federal Republic of Germany
 : Knight Grand Cross with Collar of the Order of the Holy Sepulchre
  Sovereign Military Order of Malta: Protector Bailiff Knight Grand Cross of Obedience of the Sovereign Military Order of Malta, 1st Class
  Sovereign Military Order of Malta: Knight Grand Cross of the Order of Merit
 : Grand Cross of the National Order of Merit
 House of Habsburg: Knight of the Order of the Golden Fleece, 1960

See also

Monarchism in Bavaria after 1918

References

Bibliography
 Adalbert, Prinz von Bayern. Die Wittelsbacher: Geschichte unserer Familie. München: Prestel, 1979.

1933 births
Living people
Dachau concentration camp survivors
German art collectors
German Roman Catholics
LGBT royalty
House of Wittelsbach
Francis 2
Pretenders to the Bavarian throne
Knights of the Golden Fleece of Austria
Bailiffs Grand Cross of Honour and Devotion of the Sovereign Military Order of Malta
Franz Prince of Bavaria
Knights of the Holy Sepulchre
Commanders Crosses of the Order of Merit of the Federal Republic of Germany
Recipients of the National Order of Merit (Romania)
Recipients of the Order pro Merito Melitensi